Hægeland is a former municipality in Vest-Agder county, Norway.  The  municipality existed from 1896 until its dissolution in 1964.  The municipality was located in the northwestern part of the present-day municipality of Vennesla.  The administrative centre was the village of Hægelandskrossen where Hægeland Church is located.

History
The municipality of Hægeland was established on 1 July 1896 when the old municipality of Øvrebø og Hægeland was divided into the separate municipalities of Hægeland (population: 843) and Øvrebø (population: 888).  During the 1960s, there were many municipal mergers across Norway due to the work of the Schei Committee.  On 1 January 1964, the municipality of Hægeland (population: 849) was dissolved and merged with the neighboring municipalities of Vennesla (population: 7,321), and most of Øvrebø (population: 925) to form a new Vennesla municipality.  (Vennesla was previously part of the old municipality of Øvrebø og Hægeland until 1865).

Name
The municipality (originally the parish) is named after the old Hægeland farm (Old Norse: Helgaland) since that is where the Hægeland Church was located.  The first element of the name means "holy" (Old Norse: heilagr and ) and the last element (Old Norse: land) is identical with the word land which means "land".  This area was important to ancient Norse pagan worship.

Government
All municipalities in Norway, including Hægeland, are responsible for primary education (through 10th grade), outpatient health services, senior citizen services, unemployment and other social services, zoning, economic development, and municipal roads.  The municipality was governed by a municipal council of elected representatives, which in turn elected a mayor.

Municipal council
The municipal council  of Hægeland was made up of representatives that were elected to four year terms.  The party breakdown of the final municipal council was as follows:

See also
List of former municipalities of Norway

References

Vennesla
Former municipalities of Norway
1896 establishments in Norway
1964 disestablishments in Norway